The 2019 FIVB Women's World Cup was the 13th edition of the event, contested by the senior women's national teams of the members of the  (FIVB), the sport's global governing body. The tournament was held from 14 to 29 September 2019 in Japan. This was the first time that the FIVB did not distribute Olympics places since 1991 due to Japan hosting the 2020 Summer Olympics, but points for the FIVB World Rankings were given.

China won their historic fifth title, following titles from 1981, 1985, 2003, and 2015. China surpassed Cuba's earlier record of four titles in the history of the competition. Defending their title as the reigning champions in 2015, China reigned to sweep all eleven matches in Yokohama, Sapporo and Osaka. USA and Russia complete the 2019 podium as silver medallists and bronze medallists respectively.

Zhu Ting, outside hitter and captain of the Chinese women's volleyball national team, was selected as the World Cup's MVP, retaining her title from 2015. Zhu was joined in the Dream Team by three members of the gold medal-winning Chinese side – Yan Ni as Best Middle Blocker, Wang Mengjie as Best Libero, and Ding Xia as Best Setter. Two members of the USA squad that finished second to the Chinese Team also made the Dream Team, as Kelsey Robinson and Andrea Drews won the Best Outside Spiker and Best Opposite awards, respectively. Russia's Irina Koroleva also won as Best Blocker.

Qualification
Twelve teams qualified for the competition as the top two teams of FIVB World Rankings of each continental federation on 1 January 2019. (except Japan who qualified as host, and Serbia who qualified as 2018 World Champion)

Qualified teams

Notes
1 Competed as Soviet Union from 1973 to 1991; 3rd appearance as Russia.

Squads

Coaches
 Oldest coach:  José Roberto Guimarães – 65 years and 44 days in the first game against Serbia.
 Youngest coach:  Jamie Morrison – 38 years and 306 days in the first game against Argentina.

Players
 Appearance record:  Fabiana Claudino,  Prisilla Altagracia Rivera Brens,  Janet Wanja, Mercy Moim, and  Kim Yeon-koung participated in the World Cup four times.
 Oldest player: At 38 years and 38 days,  Annerys Vargas is the oldest player ever to be nominated in the tournament.
 Youngest player:  Bojana Gočanin is the youngest player at the age of 16 years and 354 days.
 Tallest player: At 2.01 m,  Yuan Xinyue and  Brayelin Martínez are the tallest players ever to be nominated in the tournament.
 Shortest player: At 1.60 m,  Léia Silva is the shortest player ever to be nominated in the tournament.

Venues

Format

The competition system of the 2019 World Cup was the single Round-Robin system. Each team played once against each of the 11 remaining teams.

The teams were divided into 2 pools of 6 teams each. In round 1, total 30 matches in 5 days, each teams played against the other teams from the same pool. For rounds 2 and 3, total 36 matches in 6 days, each team played against the teams from another pool.

Numbers in brackets denoted the FIVB World Ranking as of 1 January 2019 except the hosts who ranked 6th.

Pool standing procedure
 Total number of victories (matches won, matches lost)
 In the event of a tie, the following first tiebreaker will apply: The teams will be ranked by the most point gained per match as follows:
 Match won 3–0 or 3–1: 3 points for the winner, 0 points for the loser
 Match won 3–2: 2 points for the winner, 1 point for the loser
 Match forfeited: 3 points for the winner, 0 points (0–25, 0–25, 0–25) for the loser
 If teams are still tied after examining the number of victories and points gained, then the FIVB will examine the results in order to break the tie in the following order:
 Set quotient: if two or more teams are tied on the number of points gained, they will be ranked by the quotient resulting from the division of the number of all set won by the number of all sets lost.
 Points quotient: if the tie persists based on the set quotient, the teams will be ranked by the quotient resulting from the division of all points scored by the total of points lost during all sets.
 If the tie persists based on the point quotient, the tie will be broken based on the team that won the match of the Round Robin Phase between the tied teams. When the tie in point quotient is between three or more teams, these teams ranked taking into consideration only the matches involving the teams in question.

Results

|}

All times are Japan Standard Time (UTC+09:00).

First round

Site A
|}

Site B
|}

Second round

Site A
|}

Site B
|}

Third round

Site A
|}

Site B
|}

Final standing

Awards

 Most Valuable Player
  Zhu Ting
 Best Setter
  Ding Xia
 Best Outside Hitters
  Zhu Ting
  Kelsey Robinson

 Best Middle Blockers
  Irina Koroleva
  Yan Ni
 Best Opposite Hitter
  Andrea Drews
 Best Libero
  Wang Mengjie

Statistics leaders
The statistics of each group follows the vis reports P2 and P3. The statistics include 6 volleyball skills; serve, reception, set, spike, block, and dig. The table below shows the top 5 ranked players in each skill plus top scorers as of 29 September 2019.

Best Scorers
Best scorers determined by scored points from attack, block and serve.

Best Attackers
Best attackers determined by successful attacks in percentage.

Best Blockers
Best blockers determined by the average of stuff blocks per set.

Best Servers
Best servers determined by the average of aces per set.

Best Setters
Best setters determined by the average of running sets per set.

Best Diggers
Best diggers determined by the average of successful digs per set.

Best Receivers
Best receivers determined by efficient receptions in percentage.

References

2019 Women
FIVB World Cup Women
FIVB Volleyball Women's World Cup
International volleyball competitions hosted by Japan
FIVB Volleyball Women's World Cup
Women's volleyball in Japan